The following is an episode list for the 2008 reality series Scream Queens. Season one of the series premiered on VH1 on October 20, 2008 in the United States. Season two premiered on August 2, 2010.



Series overview

Episodes

Season 1: 2008

Episode Progress (Season 1)

 The contestant won Scream Queens.
 The contestant was named that week's Leading Lady.
 The contestant was called to the ballroom for very good performance but was not named the Leading Lady.
 The contestant was called to the ballroom for both good and bad performance.
 The contestant was called to the ballroom for bad performance but was not eliminated.
 The contestant was eliminated (axed).

Season 2: 2010
On August 12, 2009, VH1 began casting for a second season of Scream Queens. Season 2 began shooting in November 2009 and premiered in August 2010, with the winner gaining a role in Saw 3D also known as Saw VII, the next entry in the Saw franchise. Jaime King replaced Shawnee Smith as mentor and host, while Tim Sullivan replaced James Gunn as the director.

Episode Progress (Season 2)

 The contestant won Scream Queens.
 The contestant was named that week's Leading Lady.
 The contestant was called to the ballroom for very good performance but was not named the Leading Lady.
 The contestant was called to the ballroom for both good and bad performance.
 The contestant was called to the ballroom for bad performance but was not eliminated.
 The contestant was eliminated (axed).

In episode 7, Tai wasn't immune from the elimination

References

External links
Official page on VH1.com

Scream Queens at TVGuide.com
Scream Queens at MSN

Scream Queens